During World War II, the navies of both the Allies and the Axis Powers built and operated hundreds of relatively small warships for the purpose of ensuring the safety of merchant convoys. These warships displaced around 1,000 tons and were typically armed with one-to-three guns of three-to-five inches in caliber, numerous smaller anti-aircraft guns and depth charge throwers.

Summary

Allied escort vessel classes

United States (destroyer escorts and frigates and patrol craft)
Evarts-class destroyer escort - 97 built
Buckley-class destroyer escort - 148 built
Cannon-class destroyer escort - 72 built 
Edsall-class destroyer escort - 85 built
Rudderow-class destroyer escort - 22 built
John C. Butler-class destroyer escort - 83 completed
Tacoma-class frigate - 96 built
PC-461 class submarine chaser - 343 built
PCE-842 class patrol craft escort - 68 built

United Kingdom (frigates and corvettes)
 – 12 (original) + 25 (modified)
 – 151 built
 – 26 built (4 more completed after the end of the war)
 – 7 built (23 more completed after the end of the war)
 – 294 built
 – 49 built

Axis escort vessel classes

Japan (Kaibōkan)
 – 4 built
 – 14 built
 – 8 built
 – 9 built
 – 29 built
Type C escort ship – 56 built
Type D escort ship – 67 built

Italy
Gabbiano-class corvette - 49 built

Germany (Flottenbegleiter)
F-class escort ship - 10 built

Romania
Amiral Murgescu

Military equipment of World War II
World War II naval ships
Lists of World War II ships